State Highway 135 (SH 135) is a  state highway in the U.S. state of Colorado. SH 135's southern terminus is at U.S. Route 50 (US 50) in Gunnison, and the northern terminus is at 6th Street in Crested Butte. It is the primary connection between Crested Butte and the outside world and is the only paved road leading to Crested Butte.

Route description
It begins at the intersection of U.S. Highway 50 and Main Street in Gunnison and follows Main Street North out of town. Between miles 10 and 11, it passes through the community of Almont.  It terminates at the intersection of Elk Avenue and 6th Street (the Four Way Stop) in Crested Butte.

History 
The route was established in the 1920s, when it began at SH 92 in Hotchkiss and ended at Gunnison. The route was paved from its southern terminus to Paonia and from Almont to Gunnison by 1950. SH 135 was split into two discontinuous sections in 1954 when the segment over Kebler Pass was turned back to Gunnison County. The route was completely paved by 1958. The section between Hotchkiss and Bardine was renumbered in 1970 as an extension of SH 133, leaving what is left today.

Major intersections

References

External links

135
Transportation in Gunnison County, Colorado